

Trinidad (Spanish for "Trinity") was the flagship of Ferdinand Magellan's voyage of circumnavigation.  Unlike Elcano's Victoria, which returned to Spain sailing across the Indian Ocean, Trinidad tried and failed to sail east across the Pacific to New Spain or modern-day Mexico. Trinidad was a nao (ship) of 100 or 110 tonels with square sails on the fore and main masts and a lateen mizzen. Its original crew was 61.  After Magellan's death and the burning of the Concepcion, Victoria and Trinidad (the San Antonio and the Santiago being lost earlier) reached Tidore on 8 November 1521. In mid-December both ships attempted to depart loaded with cloves, but Trinidad almost immediately began to leak badly.  Inspection showed that the problem was serious. It was agreed that Victoria would leave for Spain and Trinidad would remain for repairs.

On 6 April 1522, Trinidad left Tidore loaded with 50 tonels of cloves.  Her commander was Gonzalo Gomez de Espinosa, Magellan's alguacil (master-at-arms), a good soldier, but no sailor. After ten days Trinidad put in at one of the Marianas, where three men deserted, and then headed northeast. Espinosa was apparently trying to reach the Westerlies, but did not find them, probably because of the summer monsoon. He reached 42 or 43 degrees north in increasingly bad weather. Scurvy set in, ultimately killing 30 men and leaving only 20 to sail the ship. Five months after leaving, he turned back and two months later reached the Moluccas.

The previous May a fleet of seven Portuguese ships under António de Brito reached Tidore, seeking to arrest Magellan. Espinosa sent Brito a letter begging for supplies. Brito sent an armed party to capture Trinidad, but, instead of armed resistance, they found only a ship on the verge of sinking and a crew near death.  Trinidad was sailed back to Ternate where her sails and rigging were removed. The ship was caught in a storm and smashed to pieces.

Only four of the survivors got back to Europe. Juan Rodriguez escaped in a Portuguese ship.  The remaining three — commander Espinosa, seaman and expedition diarist Ginés de Mafra, and Norwegian gunner Hans Vargue (or Bergen) — spent two years at hard labor before being shipped to Lisbon and more prison.  Vargue died in the Portuguese prison. Espinosa is last heard of in 1543 as a Spanish inspector of ships.  

De Mafra, the last to be released because of the many documents he possessed, in time did become a pilot  in part because of the experience he gained with Magellan's expedition.  In 1541 he was named pilot of the  under Ruy López de Villalobos; two years later, wrecked on a Philippine island, he wrote about the Magellan expedition while waiting on ship repairs.  Here the Magellan expedition was remembered favorably by royalty, and ultimately he with 29 other men chose to remain in the Philippines rather than resume with the failing Villalobos expedition. De Mafra's notes from his wait remained unpublished until found in 1920.

Notes

References

Citations

Bibliography

 

 .

Exploration ships
Age of Discovery ships
16th-century maritime incidents
Magellan expedition
Spanish exploration in the Age of Discovery